Pseudocordulia circularis is a species of dragonfly in the family Pseudocorduliidae,
known as the circle-tipped mistfly. 
It is a medium-sized, bronze-black dragonfly with clear wings.
It is endemic to north-eastern Queensland, Australia,
where it inhabits rainforest streams.

Gallery

Note
There is uncertainty about which family Pseudocordulia circularis best belongs to: Pseudocorduliidae, Synthemistidae, or Corduliidae.

See also
 List of Odonata species of Australia

References

Odonata of Australia
Insects of Australia
Endemic fauna of Australia
Taxa named by Robert John Tillyard
Insects described in 1909